Charles Paraventi (born July 4, 1969) is an American-born Brazilian actor.

Biography 
Paraventi was born in New York City, where he began his career doing magic shows for five years at a Brazilian club. As a child, he participated in several plays.

Career

Theater

Filmography

Television

References

External links 

1969 births
Living people
Male actors from New York City
American people of Brazilian descent
American people of Italian descent
Brazilian male actors
American emigrants to Brazil